Chandler-Bixby-Abbot House (1673) is a historic house in Andover, Massachusetts and is the oldest surviving house in Andover.

History
The house was built before 1673 by Captain Thomas Chandler, a blacksmith who was one of the original proprietors of Andover, as part of his sixty-acre farm. The house was inherited by his daughter Hannah Bigsby (Bixby) upon Chandler's death. The farm house was later remodeled in a Georgian style. The house was added to the National Register of Historic Places in 1982. It is one of the oldest surviving houses in Massachusetts.

See also
List of the oldest buildings in Massachusetts
National Register of Historic Places listings in Andover, Massachusetts
National Register of Historic Places listings in Essex County, Massachusetts

References

Houses in Andover, Massachusetts
National Register of Historic Places in Andover, Massachusetts
Houses on the National Register of Historic Places in Essex County, Massachusetts